Plateau Systems is a provider of Talent Management Systems headquartered in Arlington, Virginia, with offices across the United States, Europe and Asia Pacific. The company provides SaaS products that allow organizations to develop, any nice analyse  and manage organizational talent.

History
Plateau Systems was founded in 1996 by Paul Sparta, chairman and CEO, and Brad Cooper, senior vice president, product strategy – both of whom still serve as Plateau executives. Plateau Systems developed one of the industry's first Learning Management Systems (LMS), systems usually used by Human Resources departments for the management and delivery of learning and training across organizations. Plateau's customers include some of the major global organizations and government agencies such as General Electric, Bank of America, the Internal Revenue Service (IRS) and Capital One Services. 

In early 2000, Plateau Systems delivered an integrated J2EE-based talent management platform, which allowed organizations to link learning and training with employee performance to measure whether employee goals were aligned with corporate objectives. 

In 2007, Plateau acquired Nuvosoft, a provider of Web-based compensation management software and integrated Nuvosoft's functionality into its talent management platform. 

On April 26, 2011 it was announced that Plateau would be acquired by SuccessFactors for $145 million in cash plus $145 million in stock.

Management team

 Paul Sparta – chairman and CEO
 Brian F.X. Murphy – president and COO
 Ed Cohen – chief technology officer
 Shelly Heiden – executive vice president global operations
 Stephen Blodgett – chief financial officer
 Brad Cooper – senior vice president, product strategy
 Jeff Kristick – senior vice president, marketing
 Joe Herman – senior vice president, product management and alliances
 Sunil Chandran – senior vice president, product engineering
 Larry Thomas – senior vice president, quality assurance & corporate security

Awards
 Plateau Systems debuted in the "Visionary" sector of Gartner's 2009 "Employee Performance Management (EPM) Software Magic Quadrant" 
 Customers and industry analysts recognized Plateau Systems as a customer satisfaction leader and for its continued leadership, vision and technology innovation.
 Plateau Systems positioned as a Major Player in IDC's 2009 Integrated Talent Management MarketScape report 
 Leader in Gartner's 2008 "Magic Quadrant for Corporate Learning Systems" for fifth consecutive year  
 Leader for the second consecutive year in the "Forrester Wave: Enterprise Learning Management Suites, Q1 2008" report 
 Leader in the "Forrester Wave: Integrated Performance and Compensation Solutions, Q3 2007" report 
 Plateau Systems was recognized as a Talent management Market-Leader in Bersin's 2008 Essentials of Performance Management Practices" report 
 Plateau Systems was recognized for customer satisfaction and vision in Bersin & Associates' 2008 "Talent Management Suites: Market Realities, Implementation Experiences, and Vendor Profile" 
 Consistently recognized by Bersin & Associates as a Leader for LMS Customer Satisfaction
 Plateau Systems was recognized as one of Virginia's 2008 Fastest Growing Companies in Deloitte's Technology Fast 50 Program, for fifth straight year

See also
 Software as a service (SaaS)
 Talent Management Systems
 Learning Management
 Performance Management
 Career & Succession Planning
 Compensation Management
 Content Management
 Business Intelligence

References

Companies established in 1996
Software companies based in Virginia
Companies based in Arlington County, Virginia
Defunct software companies of the United States

es:Plateau
fr:Plateau
nl:Plateau
pl:Plateau
pt:Plateau